Kosovo's declaration of independence from Serbia was enacted on Sunday, 17 February 2008 by a unanimous vote of the Assembly of Kosovo. All 11 representatives of the Serb minority boycotted the proceedings. International reaction was mixed, and the world community continues to be divided on the issue of the international recognition of Kosovo. Bosnia and Herzegovina's reaction to the 2008 Kosovo declaration of independence is mixed. Bosniak and Croat members of the Presidency want to recognise Kosovo, but Serb members refuse. Bosnia and Herzegovina's constitution requires consensus among all three members in order to perform such an action.

Reaction
On 21 February 2008, Republika Srpska, one of the two entities of Bosnia and Herzegovina, adopted a resolution through which it denounced and refused to recognise the unilateral declaration of independence of Kosovo from Serbia. In addition, the parliament adopted a resolution stating that in the event that a majority of EU and UN states recognise Kosovo's independence, Republika Srpska would cite the Kosovo secession as a precedent and move to hold a referendum on its own constitutional status within Bosnia and Herzegovina. Finally, the resolution called upon all Republika Srpska officials to do everything in order to prevent Bosnia and Herzegovina from recognising Kosovo's declared independence.

On 27 August 2008, former Bosnian ambassador in Turkey Hajrudin Somun wrote an editorial discussing Kosovan passports, where he summarised to-date the Bosnian position on Kosovo: "As in many other matters, Bosnia and Herzegovina is deeply divided over Kosovo's independence. The parliament of the Republika Srpska entity, which covers 49 percent of the country's territory, adopted a special resolution denouncing Kosovo's independence and wide demonstrations have been organized there in protest. Keeping in mind that Serb leaders of that entity have threatened to secede from Bosnia and Herzegovina and join Serbia as compensation for losing Kosovo, Bosnian Presidency Chairman Haris Silajdžić said simply that his country is 'unlikely to recognize Kosovo's independence any time soon due to strong objections from its own Serb community.

The Foreign Minister Sven Alkalaj informed the public on 2 August 2008 that by law Bosnia and Herzegovina cannot accept Kosovan passports, until the Bosnian presidency makes such a determination.

On 26 September 2008 while attending General Assembly of the UN in New York, Bosnian President Haris Silajdžić said in a Voice of America interview broadcast back to Bosnia in Bosnian language that he supports Kosovo's independence and is opposed to Serbia's request that the ICJ issue an opinion on the legitimacy of Kosovo's independence. Silajdžić spoke in his own name because the Presidency of Bosnia and Herzegovina did not adopt a platform which would allow him to speak officially.

In August 2009 the Forum of Bosniaks of Kosovo requested that Bosnia recognise Kosovo and the travel documents of its citizens. In response, Presidency member Nebojša Radmanović stated that the Presidency would not discuss the issue in the foreseeable future, and that those making such demands must consider "what kind of state Bosnia-Herzegovina is, what tendencies are present, and what could be the consequences of such a move". He said, "Sometimes, thinking with the heart is not good for the bigger political goals".

In July 2010, Željko Komšić, the croat member of Bosnia-Herzegovina's Presidency, announced that he recognised Serbia without Kosovo. He repeated the same stance in December 2019.

In April 2012 the President of the Republika Srpska Milorad Dodik said that the Bosnian Minister of Foreign Affairs Zlatko Lagumdžija in the first session of the Council of Ministers of Bosnia and Herzegovina tried to insert a statute that was supposed to regulate or lead to some essential informal recognition of Kosovo, but he blocked the process.

Bosnia-Herzegovina remains the only country of the former Yugoslavia (besides Serbia itself) that does not recognize Kosovo's independence.

See also 

 Bosnia and Herzegovina–Kosovo relations

References

State reactions to the 2008 Kosovo declaration of independence
Politics of Bosnia and Herzegovina
Bosnia and Herzegovina–Kosovo relations